The Malleson mission was a military action by a small autonomous force of British troops, led by General Wilfrid Malleson, operating against Bolshevik forces over large distances in Transcaspia (modern Turkmenistan) between 1918 and 1919.

Background 
In 1918 Russian Turkestan was in chaos. The Bolshevik Tashkent Soviet was under attack from various groups, including cossacks, who had claimed independence for their respective regions. In addition, there were dealings between the White Russian forces and the British. Geopolitically, from the British point of view, the area was of interest to  them because of its proximity to British India and Persia and their general sphere of influence. While Russia remained an ally this was not an issue for the British, but with the Bolshevik revolution of 1917, it became one. To add to the complex situation, around 28,000 German and Austro-Hungarian soldiers were in the area, as prisoners of war.

The mission 

Concerned about the Bolsheviks and German and Turkish military activity, the British Government decided to send a force to the area, from India. The force was to be led by General Wilfrid Malleson.  His mission was given as "to combat German and Turkish propaganda and attempts to organise men, railways and resources towards assisting hostile enterprises, aggression or active operations against us or our Allies."

Malleson instructed Reginald Teague-Jones to make preliminary  contact with the Ashkhabad Committee, the group in control of the anti-Bolshevik Transcaspian Government. The first military action occurred when a machine gun detachment was sent across the Indian border to aid the Transcaspian forces against the Bolsheviks. The detachment of Indian gunners, led by a British officer, assisted some local units in a battle against the Tashkent Soviet Bolsheviks during the Battle of Artik. The local units were outnumbered, disorganised and nearly defeated. However, the two Indian machine gun crews inflicted 350 casualties and prevented a total rout of the Transcaspians.

Malleson had further contact with the Ashkhabad Committee. They were eager to secure British funding and support, as they basically had no economy or method for raising funds. Two British colonels had secured dealings with another group, the Turkestan Union, a shadowy group who secured money from the British but whose motivation and levels of support were unclear. The group and the money were not seen again.

On 12 August, Malleson moved his 500 men of the 19th Punjabi Regiment across the border. These joined the local force of 1,000 Transcaspians, who were seen by the British as rather poor quality troops. They were commanded by a Turkmen chieftain, Oraz Sirdar. The Bolshevik force, consisting of a good proportion of Austrian ex-POWs, attacked the British-Transcaspian force, but was repelled at Kushkh on the Afgan border. There was further action at Kaka, Turkmenistan, on 28 August, 11 September and 18 September, which saw a minor success for the British, encouraging the Transcaspian and British leadership in Meshed. Malleson then received some reinforcements with the arrival of the 28th Light Cavalry from Persia.

At this point, Malleson, against the wishes of the Indian Government, decided to push further into Transcaspia and attack the Bolsheviks. The combined force completed a double night march, and engaged and defeated the Bolsheviks at Arman Sagad between 9 and 11 October and at the Battle of Dushak on 14 October. At Dushak, the British force suffered 54+ killed & 150+ wounded while inflicting 1,000 casualties on the Bolsheviks. The Anglo-Indian forces did most of the fighting, with the Transcaspian forces largely unreliable. A bayonet charge by the Punjabi infantry, as well as an attack by the 28th Cavalry, eventually drove off the Bolshevik forces. The Transcaspian forces retired to Kaakha, while the Bolshevik forces retired with their trains to Dushak but then pulled back further to Merv. The British occupied Tejend on 20 October. The Transcaspian force then went on to occupy Merv.

Armoured trains featured in the battles, the British/Transcaspians having two, the Bolsheviks three. Roads were not usable and vehicles did not have the range. Armoured trains, armed with cannons, were used for transport and to attack.

However, with the end of World War I, one of the primary reasons for the mission, the threat from the Germans and the Turks, was no longer extant. Malleson, however, felt compelled to support the committee.

Dick Ellis served as an officer with the Malleson mission, writing his account, The Transcaspian Episode, after he had retired.

Resignation of the committee 

By late 1918 the Ashkhabad Committee was starting to lose grip on the capital and asked for British assistance. Malleson had not supplied the committee with the funds he had promised. There was general rebellion in the capital and the Ashkhabad Committee resigned. On 1 January 1919 a new Committee of Public Safety was formed to rule Transcaspia, its composition of five people largely chosen by Reginald Teague-Jones. He appointed two Turkmen to the new committee, and it became more susceptible to British influence at this stage.

On 12 January, the British force came under attack from the Bolsheviks at Annenkovo, but defended the settlement with the loss of 12 killed and  38-39 wounded.

White Russian forces, from General Anton Denikin's Southern White Russian Army, started joining the Transcaspian army in small groups. The Transcaspian Government soon became linked with the White Russian Forces.  Denikin eventually started having more control over the force, as more of his troops starting fighting with them.
On January 22, 1919, the White Turkestan Army was created.

British withdrawal 

Malleson had spent some time planning how to extricate the British forces, which was a complex task. He had told the Committee confidentially that he was withdrawing; they had decided not to tell the public for fear it would cause panic. The Committee itself was alarmed at the news, though they had been making an effort to work with Denikin and the White Russians   With Denikin's involvement in the Transcaspian, they now had a new sponsor. In order to safely withdraw, Malleson spread a rumour that the withdrawal was a feint for a flanking attack. The Bolsheviks were fooled by the ruse, and responded to the rumour by reinforcing their positions rather than pursuing the withdrawing British forces. The British forces, at this point numbering 950, began their withdrawal early in March. They had all left by mid April 1919.  However, with the British gone, the Bolsheviks launched new offensives, gradually pushing the Transcaspian forces back. They were defeated by 1920, and the Bolshevik Tashkent Soviet regained control of the territory.

Casualties 
British casualties during the Malleson mission were as follows:
 Defence of Kaakha (28 August) - 5 killed
 Defence of Kushkh - 3 officers killed or wounded, 24 other ranks killed or wounded
 Skirmish near Kaakha, 15 September 1918 - 3 killed
 Battle of Dushak - 54+ killed, 150+ wounded
 Defence of Annenkovo - 12 killed, 38-39 wounded
 10 killed in other skirmishes/actions

References

Sources 
 Ellis, C. H, The British "Intervention" in Transcaspia, 1918–1919, University of California Press, Berkeley and Los Angeles, 1963 
 Moberly, F J, Operations in Persia, 1914–1919, London: HMSO, 1987
 Sargent, Michael."British Military Involvement in Transcaspia: 1918–1919". The Defence Academy of the United Kingdom, Camberley, UK. April 2004
 Wright, Damien. Churchill's Secret War with Lenin: British and Commonwealth Military Intervention in the Russian Civil War, 1918-20, Solihull, UK, 2017

Allied intervention in the Russian Civil War
Battles of the Russian Civil War involving the United Kingdom
20th-century history of the British Army